Xavier Crone (born 19 December 1997) is an Australian cricketer. He made his List A debut on 23 October 2019, for Victoria in the 2019–20 Marsh One-Day Cup. He made his first-class debut on 20 November 2021, for Victoria in the 2021–22 Sheffield Shield season.

Crone made his Twenty20 debut for the Melbourne Stars against the Perth Scorchers at the Junction Oval on 2 January 2022, being called into the squad for the 2021–22 Big Bash after several members of the original squad became unavailable due to a COVID-19 outbreak.

References

External links
 

1997 births
Living people
Australian cricketers
Victoria cricketers
Place of birth missing (living people)
Melbourne Stars cricketers